Huihe Township  is a township in Jiaoqu, Tongling, Anhui, China.

See also
List of township-level divisions of Anhui

References

Township-level divisions of Anhui